The Itimbiri River is a right tributary of the Congo River, which it joins above Bumba. At one time it was important as a navigable waterway for transporting good from the northeast of the country down to the Congo.

Course

The Itimbiri River originates in Bas-Uélé, then flows through Mongala, and in its lower reaches defines the border between Mongala and Tshopo.
The Itimbiri is formed by the confluence of the Rubi River and the Likati River.
The Rubi River originates in the east of Bas-Uélé and flows west through Buta.
The Likati River originates to the west, then flows through Likati and southeast to join the Rubi.
Likati lies to the south of Bondo on the Uele River.

The Itimbiri flows in a general southwest direction.
The river is very winding and generally has a sandy bottom, apart from the section upstream from Ibembo, where the bottom is very hard gravel.
During low water the river widens and splits into several branches, making navigation by large vessels difficult.

Biology

The Itimbiri,  Aruwimi and Lindi/Tshopo rivers are the main right bank tributaries of the Congo River downstream from the Boyoma Falls in the Cuvette Centrale (Central Basin).
This is a flat area of lowland rainforest.
As of 2015 about 231 fish species had been identified from the Itimbiri.Mormyridae'' was the most dominant family in the Itimbiri basin as well as in the Aruwimi and Lindi/Tshopo basins.

Human presence

In 1890 the Belgian officers Léon Roget and Jules Alexandre Milz travelled up the Itimbiri River from Bumba, then the Likati River, reached the Uele River in the region of Djabir (Bondo)  and descended it almost to its junction with the Mbomou River.

A railway line (Vicicongo line) connected Bondo on the Uele with Aketi on the Itimbiri.
The line was reopened in April 2005 after being closed for 14 years.
At one time the Itimbiri was the second most important tributary of the Congo in terms of tonnage transported after the Kasaï River.

Notes

Citations

Sources

 

Tributaries of the Congo River